Charles William Parker (1 September 1891 – 1969) was an English footballer who played in the Football League for Carlisle United, Stoke and Sunderland.

Club career
Parker was born in Seaham and played for local clubs Seaham Albion, Seaham Harbour and Hartlepool BD before joining Stoke in 1913. He soon became popular with the club's supporters and he helped Stoke re-gain their League status in 1914–15. He remained with Stoke through World War I and was a key member of the Stoke squad for their return to the Football League in 1919–20 as the played in 35 matches. However, in October 1920 he was sold to First Division, Sunderland by manager Arthur Shallcross which prompted and angry reaction by the fans who believed that it was an unnecessary sale of a popular player.

He signed for Sunderland from Stoke City for £3,300 in 1920, and made his debut for Sunderland against Bradford City on 23 October 1920 in a 2–2 draw at Valley Parade. He was appointed as club captain in 1924 as Charlie Buchan left for Arsenal. In total, he made 245 league appearances and scored 12 goals in his time at Sunderland from 1920 to 1929, where he left for Carlisle United to become player-coach. One of his career highlights was to play for England against Wales, at the Victory International on 8 October 1919 at the Victoria Ground, Stoke (England 2–0 Wales).

Career statistics
Source:

Honours
 Stoke
 Southern League Division Two champions: 1914–15

References
 

1891 births
Sportspeople from Seaham
Footballers from County Durham
1969 deaths
Association football wing halves
English footballers
Seaham Albion F.C. players
Seaham Harbour F.C. players
Carlisle United F.C. players
Stoke City F.C. players
Sunderland A.F.C. players
Blyth Spartans A.F.C. players
Chopwell Institute F.C. players
English Football League players
English Football League representative players